Definition Please is a 2020 American comedy-drama film written, produced and directed by Sujata Day, who is also the star. It is Day's feature directorial debut.

Cast
Sujata Day as Monica Chowdry
Ritesh Rajan as Sonny
Jake Choi as Richie
Anna Khaja as Jaya
Lalaine as Krista
LeVar Burton as himself
Katrina Bowden as Crystal Cane
Eugene Byrd as Wayland Pines
Parvesh Cheena as Jimit Uncle
Sonal Shah as Dr. Ali
Tim Chiou as Dr. Chiou
Kunal Dudheker as Rahul
Meera Simhan as Mrs. Gandhi
Maya Kapoor as Payal

Plot
A former Scribbs spelling bee champion must reconcile with her estranged brother when he returns home to help care for their sick mother.

Release
The film premiered in August 2020 at the Bentonville Film Festival and in October 2020 at the Asian American International Film Festival. ARRAY acquired the distribution rights to the film in the United States, Canada, United Kingdom, Australia and New Zealand, and it was released on January 21, 2022 on Netflix.

Reception
Beandrea July of The Hollywood Reporter gave the film a positive review, calling it "A funny, reflective good time of a debut."

References

External links
 
 

2020 films
2020 directorial debut films
2020 comedy-drama films
American comedy-drama films
American independent films
Films about Indian Americans
2020s English-language films
2020s American films